Nun's veiling was a lightweight cloth made of wool. It was a plain weave fabric used mainly for women veils and dresses. Nun's veiling got its name from the fact that it was used in Veils by several religious orders.

Structure 
Nun's veiling was a lightweight, soft, thin, sheer, wool cloth with open weave structure. The construction was more open than a woolen batiste cloth. There were also variants in silk, cotton and mixed materials.

Use
Nun's veiling was used in ladies' toilettes, as a flounce fabric and in a variety of outfits for English women in the 19th century.

See also 
 Katharine Cornell
 The Veiled Nun

References 

Textiles